NROC may refer to:

 National Reconnaissance Operations Center
 Nelson Rocks Outdoor Center
 Northeast Regional Ocean Council